CIPA-TV (analogue channel 9) is a television station in Prince Albert, Saskatchewan, Canada, part of the CTV Television Network. Owned and operated by network parent Bell Media, it is a semi-satellite of CFQC-DT in Saskatoon. CIPA-TV's studios are located on 10 Street West (near the North Saskatchewan River) in Downtown Prince Albert, and its transmitter is located between Louis Reil Trail/Highway 11 and Highway 2, south-southwest of the city. The station operates rebroadcast transmitters in Alticane, Big River, Melfort and Nipawin.

History
CIPA began transmission on January 12, 1987. In 2002, CTV parent company Bell Globemedia (now Bell Media) sold CIPA's former CBC-affiliated twinstick sister station, CKBI-TV, to the Canadian Broadcasting Corporation, which then made CKBI a rebroadcaster of CBKST in Saskatoon. CBC shut down the transmitter in 2012, leaving CIPA as the only over the air broadcast in Prince Albert.

News programming

CIPA has made several attempts at local newscasts over the years. However, due to recent cutbacks, currently its only local newscast is CTV News at Noon. It otherwise simulcasts CFQC's newscasts, which include reports from Prince Albert.

Former transmitters

* The Big River transmitter was among a long list of CTV rebroadcasters nationwide to have shut down on or before August 31, 2009, as part of a political dispute with Canadian authorities on paid fee-for-carriage requirements for cable television operators. A subsequent change in ownership assigned full control of CTV Globemedia to Bell Canada Enterprises; as of 2011, these transmitters remain in normal licensed broadcast operation.

On February 11, 2016, Bell Media applied for its regular license renewals, which included applications to delete a long list of transmitters, including CIPA-TV-1, CIPA-TV-2, CKBQ-TV and CKBQ-TV-1. Bell Media's rationale for deleting these analog repeaters is below:

"We are electing to delete these analog transmitters from the main licence with which they are associated. These analog transmitters generate no incremental revenue, attract little to no viewership given the growth of BDU or DTH subscriptions and are costly to maintain, repair or replace. In addition, none of the highlighted transmitters offer any programming that differs from the main channels. The Commission has determined that broadcasters may elect to shut down transmitters but will lose certain regulatory privileges (distribution on the basic service, the ability to request simultaneous substitution) as noted in Broadcasting Regulatory Policy CRTC 2015-24, Over-the-air transmission of television signals and local programming. We are fully aware of the loss of these regulatory privileges as a result of any transmitter shutdown."

At the same time, Bell Media applied to convert the licenses of CTV 2 Atlantic (formerly ASN) and CTV 2 Alberta (formerly ACCESS) from satellite-to-cable undertakings into television stations without transmitters (similar to cable-only network affiliates in the United States), and to reduce the level of educational content on CTV2 Alberta.

References

External links
CTV Prince Albert
CTV Saskatoon
CTV Saskatchewan News

IPA-TV
IPA-TV
Television channels and stations established in 1987
Mass media in Prince Albert, Saskatchewan
1987 establishments in Saskatchewan